Jonas Kvederavičius  (1923–2002) was a Lithuanian painter.

See also
List of Lithuanian painters

References

1923 births
2002 deaths
20th-century Lithuanian painters